Academy of Performing Arts or Academy for Performing Arts may refer to:
 Academy of Performing Arts Baden-Wuerttemberg in Ludwigsburg, Germany
 Academy of Performing Arts in Belgrade, Serbia
 Academy of Performing Arts in Bratislava, Slovakia
 Academy of Performing Arts Ernst Busch in Berlin, Germany
 Academy of Performing Arts in Ljubljana, Slovenia
 Academy of Performing Arts in Prague, Czech Republic
 Academy of Performing Arts in Sarajevo, Bosnia and Herzegovina
 Academy of Performing Arts in Tel Aviv, Israel
 Academy of Performing Arts in Hamilton, New Zealand
 Arizona Academy of the Performing Arts in Phoenix, Arizona, US
 Darpana Academy of Performing Arts in Ahmedabad, Gujarat, India
 Greater Hartford Academy of the Arts (formerly The Greater Hartford Academy of the Performing Arts, GHAPA) in Hartford, Connecticut, US
 The Hong Kong Academy for Performing Arts in China
 Janáček Academy of Music and Performing Arts in Brno, Czech Republic
 Maui Academy of Performing Arts (MAPA) in Maui, Hawai'i, US
 National Academy of Performing Arts (NAPA) in Karachi, Sindh, Pakistan
 Northern Academy of Performing Arts in Kingston upon Hull, England
 Royal Academy of Performing Arts (RAPA) in Thimphu, Bhutan
 Subramaniam Academy of Performing Arts in Bangalore, Karnataka, India
 Union County Academy for Performing Arts in Scotch Plains, New Jersey, US
 Western Australian Academy of Performing Arts (WAAPA) in Perth, Australia